is a cover album by the Irish pop group The Nolans. Released on 23 September 1992 exclusively in Japan by Teichiku Records, the album consists of 10 English-language covers of popular kayōkyoku songs from the 1960s.

Track listing 

Lead vocals
 Bernie Nolan: 1, 3, 7
 Coleen Nolan: 2, 4, 5, 6
 Maureen Nolan: 9
 Anne Nolan: 10
 Bernie, Maureen, Anne Nolan: 8

References

External links
 

1992 albums
The Nolans albums
Covers albums
Teichiku Records albums